The Esala Mangallaya is a Sinhalese festival celebrated in the month of Esala, a month in the Sinhalese calendar which occurs during July and August in the Gregorian calendar. The most famous being the Esala Perahera.

See also
 Esala Perahera

References

Kandy
Festivals in Sri Lanka